Tyranny is the debut studio album by the American rock band the Voidz (marketed as Julian Casablancas + The Voidz), recorded at Labyrinth, NYC and released on September 23, 2014 through the Cult label. The first single from the album, the 11-minute track "Human Sadness", was released on September 2, 2014. The music video for the second single "Where No Eagles Fly" was directed by guitarist Jeramy "Beardo" Gritter. On September 19, Tyranny was made available to stream on the websites of Rolling Stone and Pitchfork.

The album was placed 50th in NMEs "Top 50 Albums of 2014" list.

Reception

Overall, the album had a mixed reception. Rolling Stone gave the album 3.5 stars, calling it "the sound of a man shedding his skin. Not pretty, but more compelling for it." Paste gave it 6.0, while Exclaim! gave it 8 out of 10, calling it "a seriously sad album...compelling." Lucas Villa of AXS awarded four out of five stars, writing, "Casablancas continues to exercise his experimental muscle in the most raucous ways with The Voidz in tow." Benji Taylor of Clash gave the album 7/10, calling it "a weirdly wonderful mesh of awkward time signatures, unconventional song structures and, in general, unbridled madness". Pitchfork was among the most negative of the reviewers, giving the album a 4.9 and calling it unlistenable and a failure.

GQ printed in a 2014 interview with Casablancas entitled, "Julian Casablancas Is Done Trying to Save You",

Track listing

Personnel
Julian Casablancas – vocals
Jeramy "Beardo" Gritter – guitar
Amir Yaghmai – guitar
Jacob "Jake" Bercovici – bass guitar, synthesizers
Alex Carapetis – drums, percussion
Jeff Kite – keyboards

Production and others
Shawn Everett – production, mixing
Ryan Fagman – additional engineering on "Dare I Care", "Xerox", "Nintendo Blood" and "Crunch Punch"
J. P. Bowersock – guru for "Crunch Punch", "Human Sadness" and "Take Me in Your Army"
Mike Bloom – additional guitar on "Dare I Care"
Brian Gardner – mastering at Bernie Grundman Mastering, LA
Dave Kutch – additional mastering at The Mastering Palace, NYC
Emily Lazar – additional mastering at The Lodge, NYC
Warren Fu – artwork
Liz Hirsch – artwork
Sam Adoquei – "The Visit of Govindu" artwork
El Teneen – "Chessboard" artwork
Richard Priest – management crew
Lysee Webb – management crew
Jack Rovner – management crew

Charts

References

2014 debut albums
Cult Records albums